Rumiwasi (Quechua rumi stone, wasi house, "stone house", hispanicized spelling Rumihuasi) or Phaqchayuq (Quechua phaqcha waterfall, -yuq a suffix to indicate ownership, "the one with a waterfall", hispanicized Phaqchayoc) is an archaeological site in Peru. It is located in the Cusco Region, Cusco Province, San Sebastián District, north of the central square of San Sebastián.

References

Archaeological sites in Cusco Region
Archaeological sites in Peru